The 2023 Virginia elections will take place on November 7, 2023. All 40 seats of the Senate of Virginia and 100 seats in the Virginia House of Delegates will be up for election, as were many local offices.

Special elections also will take place during the year.

Federal

2023 Virginia's 4th congressional district special election

A special election was held on February 21st to fill Virginia's 4th congressional district for the remainder of Democrat Donald McEachin's term, who died on November 28, 2022, of colorectal cancer. The Democratic nominee Jennifer McClellan won the special election.

State

Special elections

Virginia's 24th House of Delegates district
An election was held on January 10, 2023, to fill Virginia's 24th House of Delegates district, following the death of Republican incumbent Ronnie R. Campbell on December 13, 2022, due to cancer.

Virginia's 35th House of Delegates district
An election was held on January 10, 2023, to fill Virginia's 35th House of Delegates district, following the resignation of Democratic incumbent Mark Keam on September 6, 2022, to become Deputy Assistant Secretary for Travel and Tourism within the International Trade Administration.

Virginia's 7th Senate district

An election was held on January 10, 2023, to fill Virginia's 7th Senate district, following the resignation of Republican incumbent Jen Kiggans on November 15, 2022, to become a U.S. Representative. Democrat Aaron Rouse, an at-large Virginia Beach City Council member since 2018, faced off against Republican Kevin Adams, who is a retired U.S. Navy lieutenant commander and small business owner. New state legislative maps took effect on January 11, 2023, at the start of 2023 legislative session; however, this special election took place under previous district lines.

House of Delegates

State Senate

References

See also

 
Virginia